Trevor Modeste (born 13 January 1960) is a former Grenadian javelin thrower.

Competition record

See also
 List of javelin throwers

References

External links

1960 births
Living people
Grenadian male javelin throwers
Athletes (track and field) at the 1987 Pan American Games
Athletes (track and field) at the 1991 Pan American Games
Pan American Games competitors for Grenada
World Athletics Championships athletes for Grenada